Freddy Durruthy is a Paralympian athlete from Cuba competing mainly in category T13 sprint events.

He competed in the 2008 Summer Paralympics in Beijing, China.  There he won a silver medal in the men's 400 metres - T13 event and finished sixth in the men's 200 metres - T13 event

External links
 

Paralympic athletes of Cuba
Athletes (track and field) at the 2008 Summer Paralympics
Paralympic silver medalists for Cuba
Cuban male sprinters
Living people
Year of birth missing (living people)
Place of birth missing (living people)
Medalists at the 2008 Summer Paralympics
Paralympic medalists in athletics (track and field)
21st-century Cuban people